America's Dream is a 1996 American made-for-television drama film directed by Kevin Rodney Sullivan, Bill Duke, and Paris Barclay, and written by Ron Stacker Thompson and Ashley Tyler. It is based on the short stories "Long Black Song" by Richard Wright, "The Boy Who Painted Christ Black" by John Henrik Clarke, and "The Reunion" by Maya Angelou. The film stars Danny Glover, Wesley Snipes, Lorraine Toussaint, Tate Donovan, Norman D. Golden II, Susanna Thompson and Jasmine Guy. It premiered on HBO on February 17, 1996.

Plot
A talented young African American student presents his teacher with one of his paintings on her birthday. There are gasps of shock as the painting is revealed to be of Christ on the cross, a Christ who is black. The teacher accepts the painting graciously, and when the end of the year arrives, it is displayed with all the rest of the artwork produced in the school that year. The final ceremony is attended by the white superintendent of the area, who presides happily over proceedings. All is well until he examines the work on display.

Cast

References

External links
 

1996 television films
1996 films
1996 drama films
1990s American films
1990s English-language films
African-American drama films
American drama television films
Films directed by Paris Barclay
Films directed by Bill Duke
Films directed by Kevin Rodney Sullivan
Films based on American short stories
Films based on multiple works
HBO Films films
Television films based on short fiction